Hulsea heterochroma, commonly known as redray alpinegold, is a species of flowering plant in the family Asteraceae.

It is native to the Southwestern United States and California.

Description
Hulsea heterochroma is an annual or perennial herb growing thick, leafy green stems to heights sometimes over one meter (40 inches). The toothed leaves are 10 to 20 centimeters (4-8 inches) long. Leaves and stem are covered in glandular hairs.

The leafy inflorescence produces many flower heads also completely covered in small glandular hairs. The green, lance-shaped phyllaries are over a centimeter (0.4 inch) long. The center of the flower head is filled with many yellow disc florets, while the edge is fringed with 28–75 narrow, thready red-orange to reddish pink ray florets each up to a centimeter (0.4 inches) long.

The fruit is a hairy achene 6 to 8 millimeters (0.24-0.32 inches) long.

References

External links
Jepson Manual Treatment — Hulsea heterochroma, University of California
United States Department of Agriculture Plants Profile: Hulsea heterochroma
Hulsea heterochroma — Calphotos Photo gallery, University of California

heterochroma
Flora of the Southwestern United States
Plants described in 1868